Peamwilai Laopeam (born 20 October 1983 in Khlong Lan District, Kamphaeng Phet Province) is a Thai female boxer.

She represented Thailand at the 2016 Summer Olympics in Rio de Janeiro, in the women's flyweight. She became the first Thai female boxer to compete at the Olympics.

References

1983 births
Living people
Peamwilai Laopeam
Peamwilai Laopeam
Boxers at the 2016 Summer Olympics
Peamwilai Laopeam
Boxers at the 2010 Asian Games
Southeast Asian Games medalists in boxing
Peamwilai Laopeam
Peamwilai Laopeam
Peamwilai Laopeam
Competitors at the 2009 Southeast Asian Games
Peamwilai Laopeam
Flyweight boxers